Island Express may refer to:

Island Express Air
Island Express (train)